Charles of Orléans (1459 – 1 January 1496) was the Count of Angoulême from 1467 until his death. He succeeded his father, John, and was initially under the regency of his mother, Marguerite de Rohan, assisted by Jean I de La Rochefoucauld, one of his vassals.

Charles commissioned the luxuriously illustrated Heures de Charles d'Angoulême.

Family
Charles was a grandson of Louis I, Duke of Orléans, a younger son of King Charles V of France. He was thus a member of the Orléans cadet branch of the ruling House of Valois. The Orléans came to the throne in 1498 in the person of Charles's cousin Louis XII, who was followed in 1515 by Charles's own son Francis I.

Marriage and issue
Charles married Louise of Savoy, daughter of Philip the Landless and Margaret of Bourbon, on 16 February 1488.
 
They had:
 Marguerite of Angoulême (11 April 1492 – 21 December 1549)
 François of Angoulême (12 September 1494 – 31 March 1547), who became King of France as Francis I.

Charles also had two illegitimate daughters by his mistress Jeanne (often mistakenly called Antoinette by confusion with a member of a quite distinct family by the same name) de Polignac, Dame de Combronde, who was his wife's lady-in-waiting:
 Jeanne d'Angoulême (c. 1490 – after 1531/1538), married firstly Jean Aubin, Seigneur de Malicorne, and secondly, Jean IV de Longwy, Baron of Pagny, by whom she had three daughters. The youngest, Jacqueline de Longwy (died 28 August 1561), in her own turn married Louis III de Bourbon, Duke of Montpensier.
 Madeleine d'Angoulême, Abbess of Fontevrault (died 26 October 1543)
He also had an illegitimate daughter by mistress Jeanne Le Conte:
 Souveraine d'Angoulême (died 23 February 1551), married Michel III de Gaillard, Seigneur de Chilly. In 1534 Married French Ambassador Louis de Perreau, Sieur de Castillon.

Ancestry

References

Sources

House of Valois-Angoulême
Counts of Angoulême
1459 births
1496 deaths
15th-century peers of France